Jasmina "Mina" Kostić (born Minira Jašari, on 5 May 1975) is a Bosnian-Serbian turbo-folk singer.

Early and personal life
Mina Kostić was born as Minira Jašari in Orašje in Bosnia and Herzegovina and raised in Ledine neighbourhood of Belgrade, into a Romani family of 10 children. She was adopted at 5 years of age by Evdokija "Duda" Ivanović. Her cousin is rapper Ivan Ivanović-Juice, whose paternal aunt is Duda Ivanović. She changed her name when she was 19 in order to pay less for an Italian visa, together with her brother Enver who changed his name to Dejan.

Her former partner is singer Igor Kostić, whom she dated from December 2007 until shortly after becoming parents to a daughter, Anastasija (born February 2009).

Career
Kostić has made many television appearances and performances, three albums, and is working on a fourth. She is known for an often provocative stage appearance, which occasionally attracts media comment.

She has sung as guest at many high-profile birthday parties of Serbian celebrities such as: Dejan Stanković, Siniša Mihajlović, and Mateja Kežman.

Discography

Studio albums
Srčani udar (2000)
No Comment (2002)
Muziku pojačaj (2005)

References

1975 births
Living people
Singers from Belgrade
21st-century Serbian women singers
Serbian turbo-folk singers
Grand Production artists
Serbian Romani people
Adoptees